Mario Mataja is a former Bosnian-Herzegovinian footballer.

Club career
Mataja played club football for Borac Banja Luka in the Yugoslav First League, helping the club win the 1987–88 Yugoslav Cup and Mitropa Cup in 1992. For a brief time, Mr. Mataja was player in Austria (SV Feldkirchen).

References

https://web.archive.org/web/20120613021447/http://www.1hnl.net/igrac.php?id=617
https://web.archive.org/web/20110727140932/http://www.labin.com/www.labinsport/vijest.asp?id=7428

1967 births
Living people
Sportspeople from Banja Luka
Association football fullbacks
Yugoslav footballers
Bosnia and Herzegovina footballers
FK Borac Banja Luka players
HNK Rijeka players
HNK Orijent players
NK Hrvatski Dragovoljac players
HNK Suhopolje players
Yugoslav First League players
Croatian Football League players
Bosnia and Herzegovina expatriate footballers
Expatriate footballers in Croatia
Bosnia and Herzegovina expatriate sportspeople in Croatia
Expatriate footballers in Austria
Bosnia and Herzegovina expatriate sportspeople in Austria